Alen Deory (born 12 January 1996) is an Indian professional footballer who plays as a forward for ARA in the I-League 2nd Division and the India national team.

Career

Early career
Born in Guwahati, Assam, Deory belongs to Tiwa community (an indigenous Assamese community). He started his career when he joined the football program of the Sports Authority of India in Assam. He then joined the Tata Football Academy in 2011 but only stayed for three-months before traveling to Florida in the United States to join the IMG Academy after receiving an IMG-Reliance Scholarship. While at the IMG Academy, Alen was a part of the India IMG Academy team that defeated the United States women's senior team in a friendly match 4–0.

After spending a couple years at the IMG Academy, Deory came back to India to join the AIFF Elite Academy Academy in Goa. While with the AIFF Academy, Deory, along with teammate Udanta Singh, took part in the Nike All Asia Camp where they were both selected to join the All-Star squad in Australia.

Shillong Lajong
On 21 July 2014, it was announced that Deory signed his first professional contract when he signed for Shillong Lajong in the I-League.

NorthEast United (loan)
After signing for Shillong Lajong, Deory sign on with their Indian Super League affiliated club, NorthEast United, on loan for the 2014 season. Deory then made his professional debut for NorthEast United on 8 November 2014 against Chennaiyin FC. He came on as a 61st-minute substitute for Seminlen Doungel as NorthEast United drew the match 2–2.

Mumbai City

After having a good season with Shillong Lajong FC, Mumbai City roped him to strengthen their attack. The 24-year-old Deory featured in only a single game for the club before leaving the side.

Mohammedan SC

Mohammedan SC signs one of India’s most promising youngster Alen Deory from Indian Super League club Mumbai City FC.

ARA FC
In 2021, he signed for I-League 2nd Division side, ARA FC.

International
Deory has played for India at the under-13, under-14, under-16, under-19 and India U23 levels. He made his debut for the under-13 side in 2009 before joining the under-14 side the next year. Deory was a part of the under-16 team that played in the 2012 AFC U-16 Championship and then the under-19 team for the 2014 AFC U-19 Championship qualifiers. In July 2017, he was selected in final India U23 squad which travelled to Qatar to play 2018 AFC U-23 Championship qualification and scored a goal against Turkmenistan U23.

Career statistics

Club

International

Honours

India
 Intercontinental Cup: 2018

Personal life
Deory's favourite player is Cristiano Ronaldo, and he also looks up to NorthEast United teammate Koke.

References

External links 
 ALEN DEORY Profile
 Indian Super League Profile.

1996 births
Living people
Sportspeople from Guwahati
Indian footballers
Shillong Lajong FC players
NorthEast United FC players
Mumbai City FC players
ARA FC players
Association football midfielders
Footballers from Assam
Indian Super League players
India youth international footballers